Andrade is a surname of Galician origin, which emerged in the 12th century as the family name of the knights and lords of the small parish of San Martiño de Andrade (St. Martin of Andrade), in the municipality of Pontedeume. The first mention of this small territory is to be found in the documentation of the monastery of San Xoán de Caaveiro (18 km away), and belong chronologically to the 9th century. It was part of the region of Pruzos, which was created as an administrative and ecclesiastical territory of Kingdom of Galicia in the sixth century by King Teodomiro (reigned 559–570) through a document written in Latin called Parrochiale suevum, Parochiale suevorum or Theodomiri Divisio. From the 12th century Pruzos, and therefore Andrade, were integrated into the county of Trastámara that belonged to the lineage Traba, the most powerful Galician family. By this same time the family group: Fortúnez, begins to unite their names Andrade as surname, since in this parish their family home was located. The knights of Andrade were faithful vassals of their lords the Counts of Trastámara throughout the middle centuries of the Middle Ages.

There is a notable Jewish branch which originated in Portugal in the 17th century as da Costa d'Andrade, and soon moved into England. The surname Andrade is found predominantly in Portugal and Spain, and in countries of Latin America, Italy, Equatorial Guinea and East Timor, Goa, Philippines, and Karnataka in India. There is an important concentration of Andrade families residing in the United States, specifically, California, Massachusetts, Hawaii and Rhode Island.

The aristocratic family of Andrade 

The Andrade, sometimes spelled Andrada, became a powerful family in north-western Iberian peninsula during the late Middle Ages and the early Renaissance, during which time they held the titles of Counts of Andrade and Vilalba, amongst others, together with numerous castles, palaces, manor houses and extensive lands. The City of Ferrol and the borough of Pontedeume in particular, have always been regarded as the areas with the closest attachment to the Andrades, to the point, that Pontedeume have always been, and still is, known as The Borough of Andrade.

The two Galician Regions of Ferrolterra and Terra Chá (i.e. the Province of Mondoñedo which disappeared as a province in the 1833 territorial division of Spain though still exists as the Roman Catholic district of the Diocese of Mondoñedo-Ferrol) are known to have been part of the domains of Fernán Pérez de Andrade in the 14th century. Fernán Pérez de Andrade was made Count of Andrade and Pontedeume, and Lord of Ferrol, Serantes and Vilar. Later the family would obtain the title of Counts of Vilalba under the Catholic Monarchs gaining full control over the entire Terra Chá Region in today's Lugo Province. Most of the Galician properties, palaces and castles of the Andrade family these days belong to the House of Alba, and the present Countess of Andrade is Cayetana Fitz-James Stuart, 18th Duchess of Alba.

In Century XII Pedro Fortúnez, son of Fortunio Bermúdez de Andrade, founded the branch that at the end of Century XIII would adopt like name of lineage: Freire. By this same time, concretely in the year 1320 the last knights of Andrade are executed by order of the Archbishop of Santiago de Compostela: Berenguel de Landoira (1317-1330). This moment marked the initial starting point that placed his relatives Freire as the main lineage of the northern area of the current Galician province of A Coruña. From this same branch of the primitive Andrade, the knight Fernán Pérez de Andrade called: "The Good" (died 1397) will emerge as a direct descendant, who was undoubtedly the true founder of the so-called House de Andrade. Pontedeume, Ferrol and Vilalba were given in the 14th century to Fernán Pérez by the king Henry II of Castile due to his services against his brother the King Pedro of Castile.

Some of the main branches that emerged directly from this lineage were:
 The branch of the descendants of Nuño Freire de Andrade, brother of Fernán Pérez de Andrade, who left Galicia to settle definitively in the kingdom of Portugal. From this character, all the families that today use the surname Andrade descend from their illegitimate children.
 The branch emerged in the thirteenth century from Sancha Oanes, daughter of Juan Freire, which would use as the name of the lineage "Díaz de Andrade", or "Díaz de Santamarta" that would occupy the lands around the town of Santa Marta de Ortigueira in the north of Galicia.
 The descendants of Pedro Fernández de Andrade, son of another Fernán Pérez de Andrade, owner of the house of Andrade in the fifteenth century. This branch was established in the city of Betanzos and reached the nobility titles of Counts of Maceda in the year 1654, and Taboada.

In the sixteenth century Teresa de Andrade, daughter of Fernando de Andrade and Mariñas, first Count of Andrade, married Fernando Ruiz de Castro and Portugal, fourth Count of Lemos and main noble of the kingdom of Galicia. At this moment the House of Andrade is definitely integrated into the House of Castro, and both in the House of Alba from different marriage links.

The Portuguese branch 

This family soon spread to Portugal. This happened several times and with several different branches of the Andrade. The most important branch to go to Portugal was that of the 14th century Freire de Andrade in the person of Nuno Freire de Andrade (son of Ruy Freire de Andrade, and brother of the founder of the House: Fernán Pérez de Andrade), later 6th Grand-Master of the Order of Christ.
From this branch of the Freire de Andrade came João Fernandes de Andrade who, having served the Portuguese Kings Afonso V and John II in the conquest of the Moroccan strongholds of Tangier and Asilah, was granted a new Coat of Arms and possessions in the Portuguese Island of Madeira, namely in Arco da Calheta (Bow of the Calheta). João Fernandes de Andrade, known also as João Fernandes de Andrade do Arco, married Beatriz de Abreu and had prolific issue, descendants of whom were present in the colonization of Brazil. Jacob Velosinho de Andrade translated Saul Morteira's "Torat Mosheh" into Portuguese under the title "Epitome de la Verdad de la Ley de Moyses."

People with the surname
Alberto Andrade, Peruvian politician
Alex Andrade, American politician
Aloysio de Andrade Faria, Brazilian businessman
António de Andrade, Portuguese priest, the first European to explore Tibet
Athene Andrade, English artist
Billy Andrade, American golfer
Carlos Drummond de Andrade, Brazilian poet
Daniela Andrade, Honduran-Canadian singer and songwriter
David Andrade, Australian anarchist
Demetrius Andrade, American boxer
Dino Andrade, American voice actor
Diogo Andrade, Portuguese former footballer
Edward Andrade, English physicist
Fabrício Andrade, Brazilian mixed martial artist
Fernão Pires de Andrade, Portuguese merchant
Francisco Andrade Marín, former President of Ecuador
Glauber de Andrade Rocha, Brazilian filmmaker.
Hernán Andrade, Mexican racewalker
Hope Andrade, American politician
Ignacio Andrade Troconis, former President of Venezuela
Jaime Andrade Jr., Illinois politician
Jéssica Andrade, Brazilian mixed martial artist
João Henrique de Andrade Amaral, Brazilian footballer
Joaquim Pedro de Andrade, Brazilian filmmaker
Jorge Andrade, Portuguese footballer
Jorge Luís Andrade da Silva, Brazilian footballer
José Bonifácio de Andrade e Silva, Brazilian statesman
José Leandro Andrade, Uruguayan footballer
José María Reina Andrade, former President of Guatemala
Lady Andrade (born 1992), Colombian footballer
Leny Andrade, Brazilian singer
Levine Andrade, Indian-born British musician (violin & viola), and conductor
Librado Andrade, Mexican boxer
 Manuel Alfonso Andrade Oropeza (born 1989), Mexican professional wrestler known as Andrade
Manuel de Jesús Andrade Suárez, Colombian writer, journalist and politician
Marcelo Costa de Andrade, Brazilian serial killer, rapist, and necrophile
Mário de Andrade, Brazilian poet
Mário Pinto de Andrade, Angolan politician and writer
Mariza de Andrade, Brazilian-American statistician
Marta Andrade, Spanish figure skater
Maxwell Cabelino Andrade, Brazilian footballer
Mayra Andrade, Cape Verdean singer
Moisés Matias de Andrade, Brazilian footballer
Olegario Víctor Andrade, Argentine journalist, poet and politician
Oswald de Andrade, Brazilian poet
Rebeca Andrade, Brazilian artistic gymnast
Richarlison De Andrade or Richarlison (born 1997), Brazilian footballer
Serenella Andrade, Portuguese journalist and television presenter
Susana Andrade (born 1963), Uruguayan procurator, journalist, columnist, and politician

See also
Iberian naming customs

References

External links
  ANDRADE, VELOSINO JACOB DE - JewishEncyclopedia.com. Jacob Velosinho de Andrade, wrote a defense of Judaism in six volumes against Isaac Jaquelot under the title "Messias Restaurado Contra el Libro de M. Jaquelot, Intitulado: Dissertaciones Sobre el Messias" (The Restored Messiah, Against M. Jaquelot's Book, Entitled: A Dissertation Concerning the Messiah). It has remained in manuscript.
  Andrade RV
  short biography concerning the Chief Rabbi of Bordeaux; Rabbi Abraham Andrade, in Bordeaux France
  Book about the Castle of Andrade in Narahío, Ferrolterra
  Pictures of the Tower of Andrade in the centre of town in "Ponte de Eume" Ferrolterra
  Pictures of the Castle of Andrade in the outskirts of "Puente de Eume" Ferrolterra
  Ancestry.com Interesting American Web-site for Surname Researches
  Andrade origin in a Portuguese genealogical site
  Andrade origin in a Galician genealogical site
  Tower of the Andrade Counts of Villalba in the Terra Chá Region - Built at the very end of the Middle Ages 14th Century

Galician-language surnames
Portuguese-language surnames
Sephardic surnames
History of Galicia (Spain)
House of Andrade

es:Fernán Pérez de Andrade